Acevedo Municipality may refer to:
 Acevedo, Huila, Colombia
 Acevedo Municipality, Miranda, a municipality in Venezuela

municipality name disambiguation pages